Norman Wight (26 May 1928 – 23 January 2016) was a Guyanese cricketer. He played in twenty-three first-class matches for British Guiana from 1946 to 1960.

See also
 List of Guyanese representative cricketers

References

External links
 

1928 births
2016 deaths
Guyanese cricketers
Guyana cricketers
Sportspeople from Georgetown, Guyana